The Chongwe River is a river in Zambia. The river begins to the north east of the capital Lusaka, and alongside the larger Kafue River, drains into the Zambezi River.

References

Works cited

See also 
 List of rivers of Zambia

Zambezi basin
Rivers of Zambia